Troplini is a surname. Notable people with the surname include:

Rejnaldo Troplini (born 1994), Albanian footballer
Shkëlqim Troplini (1966–2020), Albanian wrestler